Coptopterina is a genus of beetles in the family Carabidae, containing the following species:

 Coptopterina johnstoni (Alluaud, 1917)
 Coptopterina limbipennis (G. Muller, 1942)
 Coptopterina phantasma (Peringuey, 1899)
 Coptopterina punctatostriata (Peringuey, 1896)
 Coptopterina scapulofugiens (Basilewsky, 1950)
 Coptopterina scutellaris (Peringuey, 1896)
 Coptopterina tenella (Boheman, 1848)

References

Lebiinae